Sollman or Sollmann is a surname of German origin. Notable people with the surname include:

Janeen Sollman, American politician
Melitta Sollmann (born 1958), East German luger
Scott Sollmann, American attorney and former Notre Dame football & baseball player

References

Surnames of German origin